Mountain Valley Airport  is a privately owned public-use airport located two nautical miles (4 km) southeast of the central business district of Tehachapi, in Kern County, California, United States.

The airport is used for glider operations and training. It was established for its close proximity to various advantageous lift effects for soaring where the Sierra Nevada, Tehachapi Mountains and the Mojave Desert meet.

The Skylark North Glider School performs glider flight training for civilians as well as for the US Air Force Test Pilot School (from Edwards AFB), the National Test Pilot School (from the Mojave Air & Space Port), NASA and others.  Due to the ongoing training contract with the US Air Force Test Pilot School, most NASA Space Shuttle pilots who came from the Air Force have probably received glider training at Mountain Valley Airport.

Facilities and aircraft 
Mountain Valley Airport covers an area of 170 acres (69 ha) at an elevation of 4,220 feet (1,286 m) above mean sea level. It has two runways designated 9L/27R and 9R/27L, each with an asphalt and dirt surface measuring 4,890 by 36 feet (1,490 x 11 m).

For the 12-month period ending May 28, 2019, the airport had 50,000 aircraft operations, an average of 137 per day: 98% general aviation and  2% military. At that time there were 98 aircraft based at this airport: 82% glider and 18% single-engine.

There are a sandwich shop and an RV park & campground on field. The nearest fuel sales are at Tehachapi Municipal Airport two miles to the north.

See also
 Orographic lift
 Convergence zone
 Mountain wave
 List of airports in Kern County, California

References

External links 
 "Vintage Charmers" by Chad Slattery, March 2005, Air & Space Magazine, Smithsonian Institution
 Federal contracts by Skylark North Glider School, at fedspending.org
 Aerial image as of 4 October 1995 from USGS The National Map

Airports in Kern County, California
Gliderports in the United States
Tehachapi Mountains